Craticulariidae is a family of sponges belonging to the order Sceptrulophora.

Genera
Genera:
 Botroclonium Pobcta, 1883
 Conicospongia Rigby & Pisera, 2001
 Cordiospongia Rigby & Pisera, 2001
 Craticularia Zittel, 1878
 Dictyonocoelia Étallon, 1859
 Dracolychnos Wu & Xiao, 1989
 Ecblastesia Rauff, 1933
 Esfahanella Senowbari-Daryan & Amirhassankhani, 2012
 Intextum Laubenfels, 1955
 Laocoetis Pomel, 1872
 Leptolacis Schrammen, 1936
 Pachyascus Schrammen, 1936
 Paleocraticularia Rigby & Pisera, 2001
 Periplectum Rauff, 1933
 Pleuroguettardia Reid, 1962
 Polonospongia Rigby & Pisera, 2001
 Ptychocoetis Pomel, 1872
 Ptychodesia Schrammen, 1912
 Pycnocalyptra Schrammen, 1936
 Reticraticularia Lagneau-Hérenger, 1962
 Scipiospongia Rigby, Xichun & Jiasong, 1998
 Sphenaulax Zittel, 1878
 Strephinia Hinde, 1883
 Thyroidium de Laubenfels, 1955
 Turbiplana Pervushov, 2008
 Urnospongia Rigby & Pisera, 2001

References

Sponges